In telecommunications, power ramp is the way in which the signal increases ("power-on ramp") or falls off ("power-down ramp"), which may result in spectral splatter.

See also
 Soft start
 Power gating
 Voltage scaling

Telecommunications engineering